KUNU-LD (channel 21) is a low-power television station in Victoria, Texas, United States, affiliated with the Spanish-language Univision network. It is owned by Morgan Murphy Media alongside ABC affiliate KAVU-TV (channel 25) and four other low-power stations: NBC affiliate KMOL-LD (channel 17), CBS affiliate KXTS-LD (channel 41), Cozi TV affiliate KQZY-LD (channel 33), and Telemundo affiliate KVTX-LD (channel 45). Morgan Murphy Media also provides certain services to Fox affiliate KVCT (channel 19) under a local marketing agreement (LMA) with SagamoreHill Broadcasting. All of the stations share studios on North Navarro Street in Victoria and transmitter facilities on Farm to Market Road 236 west of the city.

History
The station signed on December 1, 1997, as an NBC affiliate under the callsign of K64EQ. The NBC affiliation then moved to KMOL-LD when that station launched in October 2004; K64EQ was then affiliated with AMGTV. In 2000, the station's callsign is now changed into KXTS-LP (the KXTS callsign in now used on a low-powered CBS affiliate on channel 41). In 2011, the station has affiliated with Univision, and changed its callsign to KUNU-LP in order to match the new affiliation.

In 2012, KUNU-LP's callsign was changed to KUNU-LD.

Subchannels
The station's digital signal is multiplexed:

References

External links 
 

Morgan Murphy Media stations
UNU-LD
Low-power television stations in the United States
Univision network affiliates